Risley may refer to:

Education
 Colored Memorial School and Risley High School, Brunswick, Georgia, U.S.
 John Risley Hall, Dalhousie University, Halifax, Nova Scotia, Canada
 Risley Residential College, Cornell University, Ithaca, New York, U.S.

People

Surname
 Ann Risley (born 1949), American actress and comedian
 Bill Risley (born 1967), former MLB pitcher 
 Elijah Risley (1787–1870), American politician
 Herbert Hope Risley (1851–1911), British ethnographer and colonial administrator
 John Risley (born 1948), Canadian businessman
 Michealene Risley, American writer, director and human rights activist
 Thomas Risley (1630–1716), English clergyman
 Todd Risley (1937–2007), American psychologist
 Walt Risley (died 1971), American football, basketball and baseball coach
 Richard Risley (before 1615–1648), Puritan settler

Places
 Risley, Derbyshire, England
 Risley, Warrington, Cheshire, England
 HM Prison Risley, a prison in the district
 Risley Township, Marion County, Kansas, United States

Other uses
 Risley (circus act), a form of acrobalance
 Risley Hall, Derbyshire, a hotel and spa
 Risley Moss, an area of peat bog in England
 ROF Risley, a former munitions factory near Warrington, England
 Samuel Risley-class icebreaker, a class of Canadian icebreakers

See also
 
 Riseley (disambiguation)
 Risleya, an orchid